John Burrwood Daly (February 13, 1872 – March 12, 1939) was a Democratic member of the U.S. House of Representatives from Pennsylvania.

Biography
Daly was born in Philadelphia, Pennsylvania, the son of Irish immigrants. He graduated from La Salle College High School in Philadelphia in 1890 and from the University of Pennsylvania at Philadelphia in 1896. He studied law, was admitted to the bar in 1896, and opened a private practice in Philadelphia. He served as assistant city solicitor from 1914 to 1922. He was a member of the faculty of La Salle College from 1923 to 1930.

Daly was elected as a Democrat to the Seventy-fourth, Seventy-fifth, and Seventy-sixth Congresses and served until his death in Philadelphia at the age of 67.

See also
 List of United States Congress members who died in office (1900–49)

Sources

References

External links
John Burrwood Daly entry at The Political Graveyard

1872 births
1939 deaths
American people of Irish descent
La Salle University faculty
Pennsylvania lawyers
Politicians from Philadelphia
University of Pennsylvania alumni
University of Pennsylvania Law School alumni
Democratic Party members of the United States House of Representatives from Pennsylvania